This article lists the winners and nominees for the Black Reel Award for Outstanding Emerging Director. The award is given to the directors for their first directorial debut.

Winners and nominees

2010s

2020s

References

Black Reel Awards